Cathy Smith (born 12 January 1961) is an Australian former cricketer.  Smith played domestic cricket New South Wales women's cricket team between 1985 and 1990. Smith played five One Day International matches for the Australia national women's cricket team.

References

External links
 Cathy Smith at southernstars.org.au

Living people
1961 births
Australia women One Day International cricketers